The following is an overview of 2015 in Chinese music. Music in the Chinese language (Mandarin and Cantonese) and artists from Chinese-speaking countries (Mainland China, Hong Kong, Taiwan, Malaysia, and Singapore) will be included.

TV Shows
I Am a Singer (Season 3) (January 2 – April 3)
Sing My Song (season 2) (January 2 – March 13)
The Voice of China (season 4) (July 17 – October 7)

Awards
2015 China Music Awards
2015 Chinese Music Awards
2015 Chinese Music Media Awards
2015 ERC Chinese Top Ten Awards (zh)
2015 Global Chinese Golden Chart Awards
2015 Global Chinese Music Awards
2015 Ku Music Asian Music Awards
2015 Midi Music Awards
2015 Migu Music Awards
2015 MTV Europe Music Awards Best Chinese & Hong Kong Act: Jane Zhang
2015 MTV Europe Music Awards Best Asian Act: Jane Zhang
2015 Music Pioneer Awards
2015 Music Radio China Top Chart Awards
2015 QQ Music Awards
2015 Top Chinese Music Awards
The 3rd V Chart Awards

Debuting

Groups
S.I.N.G

Releases

First quarter

January

February

March

Second quarter

May

Fourth quarter

October

December

See also 

2015 in China

References

 
2015 in music